The 1998–99 National League 2 North was the twelfth full season of rugby union within the fourth tier (north) of the English league system.  It is counterpart to National League 2 South, which covers the southern half of the country.

As with the previous season, the battle for the league was very competitive, with Preston Grasshoppers edging out Stourbridge by just 2 points to claim the title and only promotion spot to the 1999–00 National League 1.  At the other end of the table Winnington Park, Lichfield, Hinckley were the three sides to be relegated, with newly promoted Hinckley being the most competitive of the three.  Winnington Park would drop to North 1 while Lichfield and Hinckley fell to Midlands 1.  The reason National League 2 North had so many relegation places compared to National League 2 South (3 to 1) was that both of the two teams relegated from the division above were based in the north of the country, requiring more places to accommodate for their arrival the following season.

Structure

Each team played home and away matches against each of the other teams, playing a total of twenty-six matches each. The league champions were promoted to National League 1 while the bottom three sides dropped to either North 1 or Midlands depending on locality.

Participating teams and locations

League table

Sponsorship
National League 2 North is part of the Jewson National Leagues is sponsored by Jewson.

References

N4
National League 2 North